Peter von Hagenbach (c. 1420 – May 9, 1474), also Pierre de Hagenbach, Pietro di Hagenbach, Pierre d'Archambaud, or Pierre d'Aquenbacq, was a Burgundian knight from Alsace, German military and civil commander and convicted war criminal.

Biography
He was born into an Alsatian-Burgundian family, originally from Hagenbach and owned a castle there.

He was instated as bailiff of Upper Alsace by Charles the Bold, Duke of Burgundy, to administer the territories and rights on the Upper Rhine which had been mortgaged by Duke Sigmund of Further Austria for 50,000 florins in the Treaty of St. Omer in 1469. There he coined the term Landsknecht—from German, Land ("land, country") + Knecht ("servant"). It was originally intended to indicate soldiers of the lowlands of the Holy Roman Empire as opposed to the Swiss mercenaries. As early as 1500 the misleading spelling "Lanzknecht" became common because of the phonetic and visual similarity between Land(e)s ("of the land/territory") and Lanze ("lance").

Following a rebellion by towns of the Upper Rhine against his tyranny, Hagenbach was put on trial for the atrocities committed during the occupation of Breisach, found guilty of war crimes, and beheaded at Breisach. His trial, which was held by an ad hoc tribunal of the Holy Roman Empire in 1474 was the first “international” recognition of commanders’ obligations to act lawfully. He was convicted of crimes, specifically murder, rape and perjury, among other crimes, that "he as a knight was deemed to have a duty to prevent." He defended himself by arguing that he was only following orders from the Duke of Burgundy, to whom the Holy Roman Empire had given Breisach. Although there was no explicit use of a doctrine of command responsibility, it is seen as the first trial based on that principle. It also includes the earliest documented prosecution of gender-based/targeted crimes before an international tribunal when he was convicted for rapes committed by his troops.

See also
Burgundian Wars

References

External links

THE TRIAL OF PETER VON HAGENBACH: RECONCILING HISTORY, HISTORIOGRAPHY, AND INTERNATIONAL CRIMINAL LAW
Swiss-Burgundian War 1474–1477

1420s births
1474 deaths
People from Haut-Rhin
15th-century German people
Burgundian Wars
German people convicted of war crimes
German mass murderers
People executed in the Holy Roman Empire by decapitation
People executed for war crimes
Executed mass murderers